Priest's House or The Priest's House may refer to:

 A clergy house
 Priest's House, Easton on the Hill in Easton on the Hill, Northamptonshire, England
 Priest's House Museum, in Wimborne Minster, Dorset, England
 The Priest's House, Muchelney, in Somerset, England

See also
 The Priest House, West Hoathly in West Sussex, England